The 31st Tank Regiment is an inactive tank regiment of the Italian Army based in Lecce in Apulia. Originally the regiment, like all Italian tank units, was part of the infantry, but since 1 June 1999 it is part of the cavalry. Operationally the regiment was lastassigned to the Mechanized Brigade "Pinerolo". On 10 January 2020 the regiment was reformed as a reconnaissance unit and received the name, flag and traditions of the Regiment "Cavalleggeri di Lodi" (15th).

History

Formation 
The regiment was formed on 15 July 1937 in Siena as 31st Tank Infantry Regiment with three tank battalions, which were ceded by three of the four active tank infantry regiments:

 31st Tank Infantry Regiment, in Siena
 I Breach Tanks Battalion, (Fiat 3000 light tanks, from the 3rd Tank Infantry Regiment)
 II Breach Tanks Battalion (Fiat 3000 light tanks, from the 4th Tank Infantry Regiment)
 III Assault Tanks Battalion "Paselli",  (L3/35 tankettes, from the 1st Tank Infantry Regiment)

On the same day the 31st regiment and the 5th Bersaglieri Regiment entered the newly raised I Armored Brigade. In November 1938 the regiment received the VII Assault Tanks Battalion "Vezzani" from the 3rd Tank Infantry Regiment. From 7 to 12 April 1939 the brigade participated in the Italian invasion of Albania. During operations in Albania the army realized that the Fiat 3000 light tanks of the two breach tanks battalions were obsolete and it was decided to remove them from frontline service. On 20 April 1939 the brigade was dissolved in Albania and the 31st Tank Infantry Regiment and the 5th Bersaglieri Regiment entered the newly raised 131st Armored Division "Centauro", which was activated in Siena in Italy. On the same day the 31st regiment transferred its two breach tanks battalions to the 4th Tank Infantry Regiment respectively the 32nd Tank Infantry Regiment. On 30 May 1939 the VIII Assault Tanks Battalion "Bettoia" and the X Assault Tanks Battalion "Menzinger" arrived from to the 4th Tank Infantry Regiment. During summer of 1939 the division command, the newly raised 131st Armored Artillery Regiment, and the two assault tanks battalions moved to Tirana in Albania, where the Centauro underwent a period of intense training. In Albania the III Assault Tanks Battalion "Paselli" was renamed XXXI Tank Battalion "L" ( "Light"), as were the other units of the regiment in April 1940. The regiment entered World War II with the following structure:

 31st Tank Infantry Regiment
 I Tank Battalion "L" (L3/35 tankettes, former VII Assault Tanks Battalion "Vezzani")
 II Tank Battalion "L" (L3/35 tankettes, former VIII Assault Tanks Battalion "Bettoia")
 III Tank Battalion "L" (L3/35 tankettes, former X Assault Tanks Battalion "Menzinger")
 IV Tank Battalion "L" (L3/35 tankettes, former XXXI Tank Battalion "L")

World War II 

Early in the war the regiment received the IV Tank Battalion "M" from the 32nd Tank Infantry Regiment. The battalion had been formed with the personnel of the disbanded I Breach Tanks Battalion and equipped with M13/40 tanks. In 1940-41 the regiment fought in the Greco-Italian War and in 1941 it participated in the Axis Invasion of Yugoslavia. For its service in Greece and Albania the regiment was awarded a Silver Medal of Military Valour.

In September 1941 the regiment arrived in Travesio in Friuli, where it was supposed to switch completely to M14/41 tanks. However due to a shortage of tanks the regiment was only able to muster the LI Tank Battalion "M" with the personnel of the disbanded III and IV tanks battalions "L". At the end of October the regiment moved its headquarter to Pordenone and it was decided to disband the two last "L" battalions. The regiment fielded the following units at the end of October 1941:

 31st Tank Infantry Regiment, in Pordenone
 IV Tank Battalion "M14/41", in Pordenone (M14/41 tanks)
 XII Tank Battalion "M14/41", in Aviano (M14/41 tanks, from the 32nd Tank Infantry Regiment)
 LI Tank Battalion "M14/41", in Casarsa della Delizia (M14/41 tanks)

Already in November the XII Tank Battalion "M14/41" was transferred to the newly formed 133rd Tank Infantry Regiment for service in North Africa. En route one transport carrying the tanks for one of the companies of the XII battalion was sunk by British warplanes in the Mediterranean. After the 133rd Tank Infantry Regiment arrived in Libya in February 1942 it had to cede two of its battalions: the XI to the 101st Motorized Division "Trieste" and the X to the 132nd Tank Infantry Regiment of the 132nd Armored Division "Ariete" to replace the losses these two divisions had suffered during the Panzer Army Africa's advance to Gazala in the preceding weeks. To bring the 133rd regiment back up to strength the IV and LI tank battalions were sent to North Africa. Back in Italy the 31st regiment received the XIII Tank Battalion "M" M13/40 tanks from the 32nd Tank Infantry Regiment. However the XIII battalion had to be sent to Libya during summer 1942 to replace the losses suffered by the 132nd Tank Infantry Regiment in the battles of Gazala, Bir Hakeim, Mersa Matruh, and First El Alamein.

After the Axis defeat in the Second Battle of El Alamein the 31st regiment was sent to North Africa to bolster Rommel's retreating Panzer Armee Afrika for the Tunisian campaign. The regiment departed Italy with the following battalions:

 31st Tank Infantry Regiment, in Pordenone
 XIV Tank Battalion "M" (M14/41 tanks)
 XV Tank Battalion "M" (M14/41 tanks)
 XVII Tank Battalion "M" (M14/41 tanks)

After arriving in Libya the regiment ceded the XIV battalion to the "Cantaluppi" Group, an ad hoc formation commanded by Colonel Gaetano Cantaluppi, which had absorbed the remnants of the 132nd Tank Infantry Regiment and 133rd Tank Infantry Regiment after the Second Battle of El Alamein. The 31st regiment distinguished itself at the battles of El Agheila and El Guettar, before being dissolved in early April 1943 after having suffered heavy losses in the Battle of El Guettar.

The regiment was officially declared lost on 12 April 1943 and reformed on the same day in Siena with the XIX Tank Battalion, which was equipped with M15/42 tanks and Semoventi 75/34 self-propelled guns. Plans to expand the battalion and reform the regiment were thwarted by the Armistice of Cassibile on 8 September 1943, and the subsequent occupation of Italy by the Germans, who disbanded the 31st Tank Infantry Regiment.

Cold War 
On 15 January 1951 the regiment was raised again in Verona as 31st Tankers Regiment and joined the Armored Division "Centauro". Initially the 31st had only one M4 Sherman tank battalion, but in 1953 the 132nd Tankers Regiment "Ariete" ceded a M4 Sherman tank battalion to the 31st. In 1955 the regiment moved to Bellinzago Novarese and in December 1958 the regiment was renamed 31st Tank Regiment.

1st Tank Battalion "M.O. Cracco" 

During the 1975 army reform the 31st Tank Regiment was disbanded on 20 October 1975 and its I Tank Battalion became the 1st Tank Battalion "M.O. Cracco", while its II Tank Battalion became the 101st Tank Battalion "M.O. Zappalà", and its XXVIII Bersaglieri Battalion became the 28th Bersaglieri Battalion "Oslavia". The flag and traditions of the disbanded regiment were assigned to the 1st Tank Battalion "M.O. Cracco", whose number commemorated the I Tank Battalion "L", which had served with the regiment in the Greco-Italian War and the Axis Invasion of Yugoslavia. Tank and armored battalions created during the 1975 army reform were all named for officers, soldiers and partisans, who were posthumously awarded Italy's highest military honor the Gold Medal of Military Valour during World War II. The 1st Tank Battalion's name commemorated 31st Tank Infantry Regiment Corporal Giovanni Cracco, who had distinguished himself during the Tunisian campaign and was killed in action on 11 April 1943. Equipped with Leopard 1A2 main battle tanks the battalion joined the 31st Armored Brigade "Curtatone", which in 1986 was renamed Armored Brigade "Centauro".

101st Tank Battalion "M.O. Zappalà" 

The 101st Tank Battalion "M.O. Zappalà" was formed during the 1975 army reform by renaming the II Tank Battalion of the 31st Tank Regiment. The 101st Zappalà received the flag and traditions of the 131st Tank Regiment.

Recent times 
On 31 July 1993 the 101st Tank Battalion "M.O. Zappalà" disbanded and its personnel entered the 1st Tank Battalion "M.O. Cracco", which on 1 September 1993 entered the reraised 31st Tank Regiment. On 9 October 1995 the regiment received the flag and name of the 4th Tank Regiment and transferred its own name and flag to the 133rd Tank Regiment in Altamura, which was a unit of the Mechanized Brigade "Pinerolo". Between 1 January 2011 and 28 February 2017 the regiment was subordinated to the army's Cavalry School in Lecce as test unit for the army's "Soldato Del Futuro" networked warfighting project. In 2012 the regiment moved from Altamura to Lecce.

Current structure 
At its disbanding the 31st Tank Regiment consisted of:

  Regimental Command, in Lecce
 Command and Logistic Support Company
 1st Tank Battalion "M.O. Cracco"
 1st Tank Company (13x Ariete main battle tanks)
 2nd Tank Company (13x Ariete main battle tanks)
 3rd Tank Company (13x Ariete main battle tanks)
 4th Tank Company (suspended for lack of tanks)

The Command and Logistic Support Company fielded the following platoons: C3 Platoon, Transport and Materiel Platoon, Medical Platoon, and Commissariat Platoon. In total the regiment fielded 41x Ariete main battle tanks: 13x per company, plus one for the battalion commander and one for the regiment commander.

See also 
 Mechanized Brigade "Pinerolo"

External links
Italian Army Website: 31° Reggimento Carri

References

Tank Regiments of Italy
Military units and formations established in 1937